The Adams Lake Indian Band (Shuswap language: Sexqeltqin)  is a member of the Secwepemc (Shuswap) Nation.  It was created when the government of the Colony of British Columbia established an Indian reserve system in the 1860s.  The Adams Lake Indian Band is a member band of the Shuswap Nation Tribal Council, which represents Secwepemc people in the Thompson and Shuswap districts of southern Central Interior region.  Four Secwepemc governments farther north in the Cariboo belong to the Northern Shuswap Tribal Council. Chief Atahm School houses an immersion program important to keeping the Secwepemc language alive, and is located on an Adams Lake Indian Band Reserve.

Reserves
Adam's Lake Band (Sexqeltqin) has jurisdiction over the following reserves:
 Hustalen 1
 Squaam 2
 Toops 3
 Sahhaltkum 4
 Stequmwhulpa 5
 Switsemalph 6
 Switsemalph 7

See also
Shuswap Nation Tribal Council
Northern Shuswap Tribal Council

References

External links
Shuswap Nation website
Chief Atahm School

Shuswap Country
Secwepemc governments